Quittor is an infection of the lower leg of equines, sometimes known as graveling.  A condition once common in draft horses, it is characterized by inflammation of the cartilage of the lower leg.  There are two forms, subcutaneous and cartilaginous.   Quittor usually results from an injury to the leg, such as an abscess on the coronary band above the hoof, that allows foreign matter to get into the leg and then collect beneath the hoof, leading to an infection.  In some cases, removing this matter requires cutting away parts of the hoof.  Abscesses may also form inside the hoof capsule itself from improper shoeing and trimming of the hoof, from laminitis, or from injury to the sole of the hoof, but the horse will be significantly lame for a longer period of time if the infection migrates up to the coronary band rather than down.  Treatment of hoof and coronary band abscesses today usually incorporates use of antibiotics, sometimes combined with poulticing.

Because use of draft horses has declined significantly, it is rarely encountered today.  In the 1890 International Cyclopedia, it was described as "a fistulous wound about the top of a horse's foot, and results from treads, pricks, or neglected corns, which lead to the formation of matter underneath the hoof. Any dead horn, matter, or other cause of irritation must be sought for by cutting away the hoof. A free opening must be provided for the egress of any pent-up matter. Poulticing for a few days is often useful; while healing may afterward be expedited by the injection of any mild astringent lotion."

References
EquiMed entry on Quittor
Merck Veterinary Manual entry on Quittor
George Fleming, The Practical Horse Keeper (1897)
This article incorporates text from the International Cyclopedia of 1890, a publication now in the public domain.

Equine injury and lameness
Equine hoof
Horse diseases